Yancey Glacier is a precipitous glacier in Britannia Range, flowing east from the vicinity of Mount McClintock and then southeastward to enter Byrd Glacier just west of Sennet Glacier.

Glaciers of Oates Land